John Feinstein (born July 28, 1956) is an American sportswriter, author and sports commentator.

Early life
Feinstein was born to a Jewish family in New York City on July 28, 1956. His father was heavily involved in the arts having been the General Manager of the Washington National Opera from 1980 to 1995 and was also the first Executive Director of the Kennedy Center in Washington D.C.

Career

Books

Feinstein has written 44 books. His book A Season on the Brink chronicles a year in the life of the Indiana University basketball team and its coach, Bob Knight. In 1995, he published A Good Walk Spoiled, about a year on the PGA Tour as told through the stories of 17 players.

Feinstein has also written a sports-mystery series for young adults in which main characters Stevie Thomas and Susan Carol Anderson are reporting on major sporting events including the Final Four, US Open (tennis), Super Bowl, World Series, the Army–Navy Game, and the Summer Olympics.

Film
A Season on the Brink was adapted to film with an ESPN production of the same title. It starred Brian Dennehy in the role of Bob Knight. During its original airing on ESPN on March 10, 2002, the film was presented uncensored for profanity, while a censored version was simulcast on ESPN2. It released to DVD later in 2002.

Feinstein's book Caddy for Life: The Bruce Edwards Story was released in 2004. It is about the life and final days of Tom Watson's caddy, Bruce Edwards, who was diagnosed with ALS (also known as Lou Gehrig's Disease.) Feinstein and long-time friend Terry Hanson engaged the William Morris Agency and commissioned a screenplay in conjunction with Matt Damon's and Ben Affleck's production company, LivePlanet. In 2010, Caddy for Life was produced in documentary format for the Golf Channel.

Newspaper and other media work

Broadcast media

On March 8, 2012, Feinstein joined SiriusXM's Mad Dog Sports Radio channel, teaming up with Bruce Murray for the sports talk show, Beyond the Brink, which aired between 10:00 am – 2:00 pm ET. However, Feinstein soon left the show by the fall of 2012, as he was offered a slot of his own show on the brand new CBS Sports Radio between 9 AM to 12 noon ET. CBS Sports Radio began 24/7 all sports talk on January 2, 2013. On November 14, 2014 during an interview on a Washington, D.C. radio program he announced that he had been fired by CBS from his daily radio show.

He has also been a regular on-air commentator for a number of other television and radio shows, including:
 The Golf Channel
 United States Naval Academy football
 The Tony Kornheiser Show
 The Jim Rome Show
 The Sports Junkies

Print media
 Staff columnist:
 The Washington Post
 Sporting News
 Golf Digest

Works

Nonfiction 
One on One: Behind the Scenes With the Greats in the Game (2011).
Moment of Glory: The Year Underdogs Ruled Golf, a profile of the four relatively obscure golfers who won the men's majors in 2003. 
Living on the Black: Two Pitchers, Two Teams, One Season to Remember: A look at the seasons of two veteran pitchers, Mike Mussina of the New York Yankees and Tom Glavine of the New York Mets, as they chase success and another World Series. 
Tales from Q School: Inside Golf's Fifth Major: The story of the players who competed at the PGA Tour Q School in 2005. Those profiled range from obscure golfers who never reached the PGA Tour to Brett Wetterich, who would win the Byron Nelson Championship and play in the 2006 Ryder Cup. 
Last Dance: Behind the Scenes at the Final Four: Tales of players, coaches, and refs in the NCAA men's basketball tournament Final Four. 
Next Man Up: A Year Behind the Lines in Today's NFL: The story of the 2004–2005 Baltimore Ravens. 
Let Me Tell You a Story (with Red Auerbach): An audio collection of Feinstein's interviews with the legendary coach of the Boston Celtics. 
Caddy For Life: The Bruce Edwards Story: The story of Bruce Edwards, the longtime caddy for golf great Tom Watson, and his battle with Lou Gehrig's disease. 
Open: Inside the Ropes At Bethpage Park: A look at the 2002 U.S. Open golf tournament, held at the Black Course at Bethpage State Park on Long Island. 
The Punch: Deals with the infamous punch thrown by Kermit Washington that nearly killed Rudy Tomjanovich during an NBA game in 1977, and its impact on both men and the league. 
A Good Walk Spoiled: Days And Nights on the PGA Tour: Winner of the William Hill Sports Book of the Year in 1995. 
The Last Amateurs: A look at the 1999–2000 basketball season in the Patriot League, a low-ranked NCAA Division I basketball conference. "Amateurs" refers to the fact that when Feinstein wrote this book, the conference had a policy against the granting of athletic scholarships, and even today strongly emphasizes the "student" in "student-athlete". 
The Majors: In Pursuit of Golf's Holy Grail: A look behind the scenes at a season's worth of majors, and what players do to win their sport's biggest prizes. 
The First Coming: A critical look at Tiger Woods and the people surrounding him. 
A March to Madness: An inside look at the 1996–97 basketball season in the Atlantic Coast Conference, featuring segments on each of the nine schools then in the conference. Notably, this was the last season for North Carolina coaching legend Dean Smith. 
A Civil War: Army vs. Navy: A look at the 1995 football season at two great military academies, culminating in the Army–Navy Game. 
Running Mates, a political novel. 
Play Ball: A look at the  Major League Baseball season. 
Hard Courts: A look at one year (1990) on the men's and women's professional tennis tours. 
Forever's Team: A look at the Duke team that lost in the NCAA final game in 1978. Because many of its stars were freshmen and sophomores, it was widely expected that the team would win a national title, but this group of Duke players never did so. 
A Season Inside: In his followup to Brink, Feinstein took an inside look at the 1987–88 college basketball season, including teams, players, coaches and officials from throughout the country. One of the teams he most closely followed was eventual national champion Kansas. 
A Season on the Brink: A look at the 1985–86 basketball season at Indiana University, especially famous for its treatment of legendary coach Bob Knight. 
Where Nobody Knows Your Name: Life In the Minor Leagues of Baseball: A 2014 book highlighting players and managers from the International League, a Triple-A league, in 2012. Among those are Scott Podsednik, a former major league All-Star and World Series hero looking for one last chance in the big leagues, and John Lindsey, who made his major league debut in 2010 after sixteen years of minor and independent league baseball, waiting for another crack at the majors.  
The Legends Club: Dean Smith, Mike Krzyzewski, Jim Valvano and an Epic College Basketball Rivalry:  A 2016 book about the three coaching legends from the state of North Carolina, their individual stories and rises to national championships as well as their rivalries against each other.

Fiction for young readers

Stand-alone 
 Foul Trouble (2013)
 Backfield Boys: A Football Mystery in Black and White (2017)
 The Prodigy (2018)

The Benchwarmers Series 

 Benchwarmers (2019)
Game Changers (2020)
Mixed doubles (2022, ISBN 9780374312077)

The Sports Beat: Susan Carol Anderson and Stevie Thomas Series 
Last Shot: Mystery at the Final Four: Winner of the 2006 Edgar Award in the Best Young Adult category. Stevie and Susan Carol get caught up in a blackmail threat to Chip Graber, Minnesota State's best player, to throw the National Championship.
Vanishing Act: Mystery at the US Open. Stevie Thomas and Susan Carol Anderson solve a kidnapping and numerous crimes at the U.S. Open tennis tournament.
Cover Up: Mystery at the Super Bowl: Stevie and Susan Carol discover that several players who are set to play in the upcoming Super Bowl have failed doping tests, and their team's owner is trying to cover up the failed tests. 
Change-Up: Mystery at the World Series. Stevie and Susan Carol investigate the contradictions in an up-and-coming pitcher's life story. 
The Rivalry: Mystery at the Army-Navy Game: Stevie and Susan Carol are preparing for the yearly Army-Navy traditional football game when something goes terribly wrong. 
Rush For The Gold: Mystery at the Olympics: Stevie and Susan Carol are back, but this time its only Stevie doing the reporting. Susan Carol is swimming for the USA Olympic team. How far will someone go to ensure she wins the gold?

Reviews
 Review of Living On The Black at Letters On Pages
 Review of The Majors at World Golf

References

External links

 Official website
 
 C-SPAN Q&A interview with Feinstein, December 18, 2011

American sportswriters
College football announcers
Navy Midshipmen football announcers
College basketball announcers in the United States
Golf writers and broadcasters
Journalists from Washington, D.C.
Jewish American writers
Living people
1956 births
NPR personalities
Duke University alumni
The Washington Post people
Edgar Award winners
21st-century American Jews